Franck Thilliez (born 15 October 1973 in Annecy) is a French writer.
Thilliez was a computer engineer for a decade before he began writing. His book La Chambre des morts was made into a film.

Selected works
 La Chambre des morts (French Edition) (2005)
 Deuils De Miel (French Edition) (2010)
 La Memoire Fantome (French Edition) (2010)
 GATACA (Édition de Noyelles) (2011)
 Syndrome E: A Thriller (Viking Press, 2012)
 Bred to Kill: A Thriller (Viking Press, 2015)

References

External links
 
 

1973 births
Living people
People from Annecy
21st-century French non-fiction writers
French male writers